Norsjö is a locality and the seat of Norsjö Municipality in Västerbotten County, Sweden, with 2,051 inhabitants in 2010. It is the birthplace of writer Torgny Lindgren, singer-actor-musician Tommy Körberg, and American author Charlotte Agell, who currently resides in Maine, United States. 

Norsjö also plays a part in the Stieg Larsson novel The Girl with the Dragon Tattoo.

References 

Norsjo

Populated places in Västerbotten County
Populated places in Norsjö Municipality
Municipal seats of Västerbotten County
Swedish municipal seats